Danil Konstantinovich Klyonkin (born 14 July 1990) is a Russian professional football player. He plays as an attacking midfielder for FC Baltika Kaliningrad.

Club career
He made his debut in the Russian Premier League for FC Tambov on 21 July 2019 in a game against FC Lokomotiv Moscow.

On 27 January 2020 he moved to Neftekhimik Nizhnekamsk.

External links

References

1990 births
Footballers from Moscow
Living people
Russian footballers
Association football midfielders
FC Tyumen players
FC Orenburg players
PFC Krylia Sovetov Samara players
FC Torpedo Moscow players
FC Tambov players
FC Neftekhimik Nizhnekamsk players
FC Baltika Kaliningrad players
Russian Premier League players
Russian First League players
Russian Second League players